Henry Arthur Hollond DSO OBE (1884-1974) was Rouse Ball Professor of English Law in the University of Cambridge from 1943 to 18 November 1950. He is author of English Legal Authors Before Blackstone, first published as a periodical article under the title English Legal Authors Before 1700 at 9 Cambridge Law Journal 292, and then reprinted separately in 42 pages by Stevens & Sons Limited in 1947. The work is "short but complete".

References
World Biography. Institute for Research in Biography. 1948. Volume 1. Page 2291. Google Books.
London Calling. BBC. 1948. Issues 432-457. Page 21. Google Books.
Kahn. Fiat Iustitia: Essays in Memory of Oliver Deneys Schreiner. School of Law of the University of the Witwatersrand, Johannesburg. 1983. Page 9. Google Books
British Book News 1947 Illustrated. Page 83. Google Books.
Potter, H (1948) 10 Cambridge Law Journal 149 JSTOR Cambridge Journals
Marke J J. A Catalogue of the Law Collection at New York University. New York University Law Library. 1953. p 140.
A L Goodhart, "Henry Arthur Hollond: 1884 to 1974" (1975) 34 Cambridge Law Journal 1 JSTOR
"Henry Arthur Holland". Trinity College Chapel.
Hollond, H A. English Legal Authors Before 1700. JSTOR.

External links 
 

1884 births
1974 deaths
Rouse Ball Professors of English Law